Stjepan Vukčić Kosača (1404–1466) was a powerful Bosnian nobleman who was politically active from 1435 to 1465; the last three decades of Bosnian medieval history. During this period, three kings acceded to the Bosnian throne: Tvrtko II, Thomas (Tomaš), Stephen Tomašević (Stjepan Tomašević) and anti-king Radivoj—the older brother of King Thomas—before the country was conquered by the Ottomans.

Stjepan, a son of the Knyaz of Drina, Vukac Hranić, and Katarina, whose ancestry is unknown, was probably born in 1404.  Stjepan's father held hereditary lands in the Upper Drina region. Stjepan was a member of the Kosača noble family who succeeded his uncle, Duke Sandalj, as Duke of Humska zemlja and the Grand Duke of Bosnia, in 1435. Stjepan influenced the development of the late Bosnian medieval state more than any other person.

Stjepan supported Radivoj in the line of succession for the Bosnian throne and refused to recognize the ascension of King Thomas, leading to a series of civil wars in the kingdom. During this time, Stjepan took the title herzog. While searching for help, he aligned himself first with the Ottoman Empire then the Crown of Aragon, and again the Ottoman Empire. The marriage of King Thomas and Stjepan's daughter Katarina temporarily restored peace but with the death of King Thomas and the ascension of his son and heir Stephen Tomašević to the Bosnian throne, peace was finally restored and reconciliation was achieved. This ensured the nobility's, including Herzog Stjepan's, full support of the king and loyalty for the kingdom, which was facing the Ottomans' advancement.

It was Stjepan's herzog title that gave rise to the name of Herzegovina, which was used as early as 1 February 1454 in a letter Ottoman commander Esebeg wrote from Skopje. In 1470, Herzegovina was separated from the Sanjak of Bosnia and re-organized into the Sanjak of Herzegovina, with a seat in Foča, and the name remains in use for the southernmost region of Bosnia and Herzegovina. The town of Herceg Novi in present-day Montenegro, which was founded by Tvrtko I of Bosnia as Sveti Stefan—the name that from the beginning gave way to a name Novi (literally "New"; also known as Castelnuovo in Italian, New Castle in English)—later came to Kosača possession and become their winter seat. During this era, the town was again renamed by adding Stjepan's title herceg (Serbo-Croatian pronunciation of German herzog) to the name Novi.

Early life and rise
Stjepan Vukčić Kosača, who was probably born in 1404, was the son of Knyaz of Drina Vukac Hranić Kosača and his wife Katarina, whose ancestry is unknown. Stjepan's father's modest hereditary lands were located in the Upper Drina region.

Stjepan was the fraternal nephew of one of the powerful Bosnian magnate Sandalj Hranić, who was the Bosnian Grand Duke and chieftain of the Kosača family. Stjepan succeeded Sandalj in 1435, becoming the most-powerful nobleman in Bosnia under the kings Tvrtko II, Thomas, and Stephen II. Stjepan's father died in 1432, and Stjepan inherited his lands in Drina as the Knyaz of Drina. His uncle Sandalj choose Stjepan as his heir in 1419. Sandalj died on 15 March 1435, following the death of his brother, Stjepan's father. Along with prestigious titles, Stjepan inherited his uncle's lands with all of the obligations, alliances, antagonisms, and conflicting interests. Like his uncle Duke Sandalj, Stjepan became the most-powerful Bosnian magnate of his time and the most-influential nobleman upon the development of the late-medieval Kingdom of Bosnia.

In the first two decades of the 15th century, following the death of its first king Tvrtko I, the Kingdom of Bosnia began developing into a less-centralized state with three powerful noble families Pavlović, Vukčić, and Hranić, who gained independence to conduct their political and economic affairs, and influenced the political life of the kingdom to the point at which they had an important role in setting up and replacing its monarchs. Bosnian unity was symbolized in the Bosnian Crown and the royal authority had a place of honor in it. The three noble families made almost all of the decisions, including influencing foreign policy. Toward the end of the second decade, however, only Stjepan's uncle Sandalj Hranić remained. The state authority was becoming influential again, and the throne was more stable. Under these circumstances Stjepan succeeded his uncle with violence.

Citizenship of Dubrovnik 

Along with his father and uncles Sandalj and Vuk, Stjepan was admitted into the nobility of the Republic of Ragusa. The City Council granted Stjepan citizenship by the charter dated 30 October 1435. As was customary, he was granted a house in Dubrovnik by the same charter.

Struggle for family inheritance

In 1435, a few days after Sandalj's death, Bosnia's legitimate Bosnian king Tvrtko II was forced to flee when the Ottomans put forward Radivoj and assured him support from important Bosnian noblemen Sandalj Hranić and Radislav Pavlović, as well as the Despotate of Serbia. Tvrtko II returned from a two-year exile in Hungary to assume the throne for the second time. Stjepan's takeover from his uncle was met with hope among his neighbors, who anticipated Stjepan would be weak and opportunistically diverted their attention toward his inheritance.

The Holy Emperor King Sigismund wanted to take Hum. He relied on Tvrtko II, who was mostly inactive in his first year of his reign. The Bosnian king then approached Stjepan and assured good relations with him, contrary to Sigismund's expectations. This prompted Radislav Pavlović to seeks support from the Ottomans and report on the harmonious relations between the king and Stjepan; their relationship remained close until at least 1440.

Sigismund had Stjepan's other enemies available; he successfully sought help from the Radivojevićs and Vojsalićs against Stjepan, and tried to persuade Dubrovnik to join his coalition. Sigismund also ordered his own vassals, primarily Matko Talovac and other Croatian noblemen of the Frankopan family, to attack and retain the land of Hum for him.

Conflicts in Neretva and with Pavlovićs 

The first of all major Bosnian nobility to act was Radislav Pavlović, while the Vojsalićs and Radivojevićs attacked in the Lower Neretva valley with success. Pavlović acted three days after Sandalj's death on 18 March, and on March 29, he was expected to enter Dračevica. Pavlović  took some of Stjepan's lands but was unable to inflict significant damage, though Stjepan had extant problems with the Hungarian king and his Bosnian allies in the west around the Neretva river. Radislav asked the Ragusans to help him achieve peace. Reluctant to take up the undertaking, they responded by saying Bosnia had many noblemen better suited for the task. Later, the Ragusans led the negotiations and pleaded with both men that a war would bring many "dangers and misfortunes" to them and their subjects, and to Bosnia as a whole. Stjepan demanded Pavlović cede lands he had taken earlier but after many missions to both noblemens' courts, the negotiations failed. Other involved Bosnians were Vojsalić's and Radivojević's. Đurađ Vojsalić's attack had produced some results, and he took the medieval market town Drijeva, which also favored Radivojević so the coalition between Vojsalić and Radivojević, including Sigismund who also wanted Drijeva, had conflicting interests. Sigismund asked Dubrovnik to pay all of the customs tolls to him and dispatched some of his men to Drijeva to set up the new regimen.

The Republic of Venice also tried to take advantage during the transfer of power from Sandalj to Stjepan. Venice unsuccessfully tried to take over the fortress of Novi via neighboring Kotor and its knyaz's maneuvering. Venice thought it could take the town by exerting pressure and influence on the fortress' castellan (governor). Despite the problems, and with some critical moments, Stjepan firmly retained the town.

During these initial struggles, Stjepan had help from the Ottomans, who supported him, and he had Bosnian anti-king Radivoj at his court. Stjepan's situation was difficult but not critical. He invited the Ottomans to Bosnia, and they helped him to overcome all of his adversities.

Acquiring Trebinje 

During the initial conflicts for his inheritance, Stjepan Vukčić's most persistent adversary was Duke Radislav Pavlović, against whom the alliance between King Tvrtko II and Stjepan turned. By the end of 1437, Duke Radislav has also fallen out of favor with the Sublime Porte, while Stjepan received a signal from the Sultan to take Trebinje from him. At the beginning of 1438, Radislav Pavlović was in a difficult situation; Stjepan took Trebinje from him and recaptured the town of Jeleč in Upper Podrinje, which Radislav probably seized from Kosača immediately after Sandalj's death. Pavlović's other fortress Klobuk in Vrm was besieged. At that point, the Ragusans told Stjepan he "took revenge on his enemies more than any one of his predecessors". Stjepan's triumph was short Radislav soon regain the sultan's sympathy, and Stjepan had to return Trebinje and other lands had taken from Radislav. Probably through Ottoman mediation, two magnates started negotiations, which lasted until June 1439, ending in peace between the two houses and the renewal of family ties; Radislav remarried Stjepan's sister.

At the beginning of 1440, Radislav Pavlović's situation dramatically changed. Because he owed the Sultan a large sum of money, probably having indebted himself during the campaigns to regain his lands and Trebinje in 1439, the Sultan decided Stjepan Vukčić should repay the debt and in return regain Trebinje and its surroundings from Pavlović. In March, Stjepan recaptured Trebinje, which caused war to break out, and in April, new negotiations between the  two parties began, pandering to Stjepan's vanity while trying to mediate between the two noblemen.

While Bosnians were fighting for personal reasons, events around them hinted at problems with far-reaching consequences. The Ragusans, guided by logic and observing Ottoman policy, advised King Tvrtko II, Duke Stjepan and Duke Radislav to jointly implore the Sultan to lower his impossible demands, and suggested it would be best and easiest if the three men together pay the Sultan thousands of ducats for Radislav's lands. They warned their Bosnian neighbors friendship bought for money is neither firm nor permanent, and indicated the fate of other regional lords, Serbs, Byzantines, Albanians, who had perished or suffered as a result of their own discord. Neither the fall of Serbia nor increasing Ottoman pressure made the Bosnian lords any less reckless. Stjepan and Radislav continued their quarrel while litigating before the Porte through envoys.

Incursion into Zeta 

At the beginning of July 1439, Murad II set out to conquer Bosnia's eastern neighbor the Serbian despotate, and was joined by his Bosnian vassal Stjepan Vukčić Kosača, who participated in a devastation of Serb realm. At the same time in the west, Albert II of Germany, who acceded to the Hungarian throne after Sigismund died in late 1437, also died two years later. A lengthy succession crisis broke out in Hungary, which prompted Stjepan Vukčić and King Tvrtko II to conquer the lands of Matija Talovac. Stjepan immediately besieged Omiš, which fell to hinm after eight months, and probably took Poljica from the Croatian ban  Stjepan and Tvrto continued their offensive against the Croatian ban and his family until June 1441, when the Talovac brothers sought a truce.

After the Ottomans' conquest of the Despotate of Serbia, and Stjepan's participation in the ravaging of it, the Principality of Zeta was vulnerable, tempting  Stjepan to conquer it. He exploited the Ottoman successes and directed his attention to the unprotected province. He asked the Kotor knyaz to assist him in capturing it, and presented himself as Balšić's successor.  Stjepan also contacted Stefan Maramonte, son of Constantine and Jelena Topi, who was fighting as a condottiero in southern Italy. The postponement of the conquest of Zeta was caused by the Serbian despot Đurađ's prolonged stay there in mid 1440, when he unsuccessfully attempted to reconcile with the Ottomans. In April 1441, after failing to get amnesty from Porte, Đurad hurriedly departed Zeta, taking refuge in Ragusa. The Sultan ordered Stjepan to attack Ragusa because the city gave refuge to Đurad, but this threat prompted Đurađ to leave the city-state. Stjepan also attracted support from knyaz Stefan Crnojević, and after the departure of Đurad, Stjepan engaged and by September 1441, he had occupied Upper Zeta to the left bank of the Morača river. He had help from Stefan, Crnojević's oldest brother, who represented the Crnojević family and was awarded with control over the five large katuns in Upper Zeta.

In his conquest of Lower Zeta, Stjepan faced much-tougher foe, the Republic of Venice. During the expansion into Upper Zeta, the Venetian government criticized Kotor's knyaz in 1439 for refusing to help Stjepan and because the knyaz attempted to thwart Stjepan's actions. The Venetians too adopted the same strategy because they anticipated danger Kotor would be trapped between Stjepan's territories and that, as the Ottoman vassal, he could endanger all of the other cities in Lower Zeta and further along the Albanian coast. The Republic of Venice did not intend to allow further Bosnian expansion in this direction. The Venetians tried to influence Stjepan's actions via their knyaz in Skadar and by invoking Stjepan's obligations as an ally of the despot Đurađ, and themselves considered occupying the territories of Lower Zeta they did not already hold. Stjepan took Bar in March 1442, which turned Budva and Drivast against him. Stjepan's armies approached and besieged both cities, which resisted for two months but both eventually surrendered to Venice. Because of these engagements in Zeta, the Venetian Republic and Stjepan entered the war,which resulted in expansion for the Venetians, who acquired additional lands on the eastern coast of the Adriatic.

Consolidation 
In his first years in power, Stjepan Vukčić consolidated his position as the family chieftain and preserved the inherited lands; he also gained important new territories of Omiš and Poljica, pushing the Pavlovićs out of their southern territories, the most important of which were Trebinje and Dračevica, and captured Upper Zeta and Bar. Radislav Pavlović died in late 1441, changing the balance of power in Bosnia. Although hostilities between Duke Stjepan and his sister, Radislav's widow, and her sons Ivaniš, Petar II and Nikola, lasted for several months after her husband's death, Stjepan captured the last of Pavlović's southern strongholds, the Klobuk fortress, before peace was brokered between them in May 1442. Radislav's successor Duke Ivaniš Pavlović maintained his side of the bargain, although a civil war broke out between Duke Stjepan and King Tvrtko II.

Throughout his reign, Stjepan, to strengthen and centralize his rule locally, was forced to suppress the aspirations of local nobility subordinate to him, who sought to be as independent as possible from Stjepan, or gain independence from him. The same thing that was happening in the Bosnian state between the throne and Stjepan happened within the local framework of his own reign—whenever the opportunity arose, Stjepan's vassals would deviate from his authority or join the king against him during the civil wars.

Civil wars

Royal succession and outbreak of civil war
King Tvrtko II died in September 1443, and on 5 December that year, stanak approved the accession of Thomas (Tomaš), his first cousin and heir, to the throne. It is unclear if Thomas was chosen by Tvrtko II or elected by stanak, and if Stjepan participated in his election. Stjepan was the new king's opponent from the start and opted for Thomas's exiled brother Radivoj, a candidate put forward by the Ottoman Empire. Sensing problems, Ragusans dispatched envoys to Stjepan's court with instructions to appeal to him by arguing he is now "the most powerful and most wise Bosnian lord" who must preserve "the peace and unity in the country"; if he does, it will bring him "glory throughout the world".

In 1443, the Papacy sent envoys to Thomas and Stjepan about a counter-offensive against the Ottomans but Thomas and Stjepan were at war. Duke Ivaniš Pavlović, who was the second-most-powerful nobleman in Bosnia after Stjepan, and who was passive when the conflict broke out during the final year in the reign of Tvrtko II, was dispatched by King Thomas to attack Stjepan. The Hungarian regent John Hunyadi had recognized Thomas. Stjepan turned to King Alfonso V of Aragon, who made him "Knight of the Virgin" but did not provide any troops. On 15 February 1444, Stjepan signed a treaty with the King of Aragon and Naples, becoming his vassal in exchange for Alfonso's help against his enemies—King Thomas, Duke Ivaniš Pavlović and the Republic of Venice. In the same treaty, Stjepan promised to pay Alfonso regular tribute instead of paying the Ottoman sultan, as he had done until then.

For the next seventeen years of Thomas's rule, events were provoked by the dynamic between the two men. Civil war broke out in 1444 and continued into the 1450s with many treaties and peace agreements. Stjepan Vukčić was a staunch supporter of and adherent to the Bosnian Church, Thomas's conversion to Roman Catholicism, probably by the time of negotiations to marry the duke's daughter Catherine between 1445 and 1446, were another obstacle in their relations.

Srebrenica and Drijeva issues

The cause of the series of conflicts, is unknown. King Thomas moved resolutely against his opponents. With Duke Ivaniš Pavlović and Duke Sladoje Semković, he entered the Lower Neretva valley in January 1444, where the Radivojevićs joined them, and in early February they captured Drijeva, a medieval market town (trgovište). In March, the king appears to have brokered a truce with Stjepan and also recaptured the mining town of Srebrenica, which was defended by the Ottomans, and was preparing another attack on Stjepan in August. Ottoman retaliation against the king allowed Stjepan to take back the lost possessions in the Neretva Valley, and place Thomas' allies the Radivojević noble family under his authority again. Also in 1444, Stjepan established an alliance with despot Đurađ Branković, against Thomas and Venice. In April 1445, Thomas lost Srebrenica, which was taken from him by Despot Đurađ, but he continued to prepare for war against Stjepan, and together with the Pavlovićs, he soon regained Drijeva.

Peace and royal marriage

Having failed to strengthen his royal authority by force, King Thomas sought another way to pacify the kingdom. A rapprochement with Stjepan via marriage with his daughter Catherine of Bosnia (Katarina), was probably mooted by 1445, when Thomas sought improved relations with the Holy See to be cleared of the "stain of illegitimacy" and to receive an annulment of his union with commoner and Krstjanka Vojača. Negotiations between Thomas and Stjepan intensified in early 1446. Tommaso Tommasini, Bishop of Lesina, converted the King from the Bosnian Church to Roman Catholicism, but by 1457, Cardinal Juan Carvajal performed the baptism.

In mid 1446, the two rivals had made peace again. Stjepan Vukčić recognized Thomas as king and the pre-war borders between the royal demesne and the land of Hum were restored, but the king re-took Srebrenica later that year. The royal wedding sealed this peace in mid-May 1446 in Milodraž, which was marked by elaborate festivities conducted through Catholic rite, followed by the couple's coronation in Mile. By this time, Catherine, who had also been a Krstjanka (adherent of the Bosnian Church), had converted to Roman Catholicism. The peace between the king and Duke Stjepan lasted for the next two years until 1448 but relations again deteriorated.

Renewal of conflict and new peace

In late 1446, King Thomas recaptured Srebrenica but agreed with Despot Đurađ Branković to share a profit from taxes and the town's rich silver mines. Peace between Stjepan and the king displeased the Ottomans because their interest lay in dividing Bosnia. Stjepan's relations with the Serbian despot Đurađ deteriorated, mostly because of the Srebrenica issue. While the king enjoyed a period of stability in relations with the despot, in late 1447, Stjepan attempted to re-negotiate a reconciliation with Đurađ by dispatching envoys to offer him "peace and alliance".

In March 1448, the Ottomans sent an expedition to plunder the king's demesne. They also plundered Stjepan Vukčić's lands, burning Drijeva in the process.

At this point, the king's position was seriously impaired by the Ottoman offensive and the rapprochement of his father-in-law Stjepan with the despot. In September 1448, the despot's brother-in-law Thomas Kantakouzenos attacked Thomas' troops while Stjepan helped the despot recapture Srebrenica. The king and Duke Ivaniš Pavlović successfully retaliated against Stjepan and his Serbian ally in late 1449. In February 1450, they re-took Srebrenica, and in April and May, they recaptured Drijeva. New peace negotiations began in late 1450 and a short-lived peace was concluded at the beginning of 1451.

Hostilities with Ragusa
In 1451, Stjepan Vukčić attacked the Republic of Ragusa and laid siege to Dubrovnik. Because Stjepan had earlier been made a Ragusan nobleman, the Ragusan government proclaimed him a traitor. A reward of 15,000 ducats, a palace in Dubrovnik worth 2,000 ducats, and an annual income of 300 ducats was offered to anyone who would kill Stjepan, along with the promise of hereditary Ragusan noble status. The threat seemed to have worked because Stjepan abandoned the siege. After King Thomas and Despot Đurađ reconciled, Ragusa proposed a league against Stjepan. Apart from the theoretical ceding of some of Stjepan's family territories to Ragusa, Thomas' charter from 18 December 1451 obliged him to attack Stjepan.

Religious strife
In the second half of 1459, King Thomas decisively acted against the Krstjani or Kristjani, followers of the Bosnian Church. Between 2,000 and 12,000) were converted to Catholicism; according to the apostolic legate Nikola Modruški, who resided in Bosnia between 1461 and 1463, the "Manichean heretics were baptized forcefully". At least 40 high-ranking members of the church hierarchy fled to Duke Stjepan, who welcomed them despite the papal request. In early 1461, to prove his commitment to the Catholic Church, King Thomas sent three bound Krstjani to Rome, where Cardinal Juan de Torquemada interrogated them. The king demanded all of his vassals convert.

Final reconciliation and kingdom's unity restoration

Stjepan Vukčić Kosača may have been the kingdom's most powerful nobleman, and the constant conflicts with King Thomas were due to be resolved by the king's son and heir Stephen or Stjepan Tomašević. Stephen, a determined new king who acceded to the throne after  Thomas' death, set out to resolve all disagreements within the royal family to strengthen his own position. Strained relations with his stepmother Stjepan's daughter Queen Catherine were relaxed as he guaranteed she would retain her title and privileges. This was noted by her father Stjepan, who wrote to Venetian officials saying the King had "taken her as his mother".

The new king, who also wanted reconciliation, took the Venetians' advice to reconcile with his step-grandfather seriously. Upon strengthening his own position, peace was restored and reconciliation achieved, ensuring the nobility's absolute support of the king and loyalty to the kingdom.

For King Stephen, it was important to get Stjepan's full support. Stjepan had sent his son and chosen heir Vlatko to Stephen's coronation, and the king was proud to announce he assumed the kingdom's throne with the  full acceptance of the nobility.

Herzog Stjepan refrained from claiming the Bosnian crown for his adolescent grandson Sigismund, Catherine's son and Stephen Tomašević's half-brother, probably realizing Bosnia needed a strong, mature monarch in a time of peril. The Ottomans threatened the territory of Bosnia and attacks against the kingdom's southern edges by Pavao Špirančić, Ban of Croatia and Dalmatia, between September 1461 and the beginning of 1462, resulted in the capture of one Bosnian border town. Stjepan prepared to counter-attack with the support of Venice but Stjepan and King Stephen agreed to an alliance with a knyazs of Krbava, the Kurjaković noble family. Venice now suddenly retreated, fearing a strong alliance could threaten its own interests in the area. To avoid a direct confrontation between both sides, they campaigned for negotiations with the ban. Venice was also interested in securing two key fortresses on the Bosnian-Croatian border—Klis was held by the ban and Ostrovica was in Bosnian hands. Ban Pavao promised to relinquish Klis to them in case of a Bosnian attack.

In the Christian world, reconciliation of the two most-powerful men in Bosnia was greeted with relief. Venice appreciated the stability that was attained after many years in Bosnia. There was an expectation Bosnia would lead the actions against Ottoman advancement. The Bosnians had failed to lead the crusade, the role assigned to them in 1457, due to the dynamism between Stjepan Vukčić and the throne, which was personified at the time in King Thomas.

After more than a decade of discord, unified Bosnia faced increasing pressure from the Ottomans. King Stephen and Herzog Stjepan knew the Ottomans would soon attack, so throughout 1462 and early 1463, they sought help from anyone, friend or foe, who would offer assistance. On 8 and 20 March 1463, Stjepan asked Venice to allow Skanderbeg's forces to cross their territory to help him, which they did but the decision to inform their outpost in Skadar was issued on 26 April. Possibly due to this belated Venetian reaction, Skanderbeg failed to carry out his promises before Venice withdrew their permission.

Last years, death and succession

After the fall of Bosnia in 1463, Herzog Stjepan Vukčić, lord of its southernmost province, lived for another three years, during which the kingdom was dismantled, all of which he blamed on his eldest son Vladislav Hercegović. Soon after taking the Kingdom of Bosnia in 1463, Mahmud Pasha invaded Herzegovina and besieged Blagaj, after which Stjepan conceded a truce by sending his youngest son, who was also named Stjepan, as an assurance to Istanbul while ceding all of his lands north of Blagaj to the Ottomans. On 21 May 1466, Stjepan, old and terminally ill, dictated his last words, stating Vladislav had "brought the great Turk to Bosnia to the death and destruction of us all". The duke died the following day.

Stjepan was succeeded as Herzog by his second-youngest son Vlatko Hercegović, who struggled to retain as much of the territory as he could. Blagaj, Kosača's capital, fell in 1466 while Ključ Castle between Nevesinje and Gacko was cut off from the main part of his territory. Vlatko's actions against the Ottomans were mostly concentrated around this fort with limited success. Počitelj fell in 1471 but Herceg Vlatko had realized in 1470 realized only radical change in his politics could bring him some release, so he pursued and achieved a peace with the Ottomans. In the same year, the Ottomans excluded Hum from the Bosnian Sanjak and established a new, separate Sanjak of Herzegovina with its seat in Foča.

The final remnants of Bosnian state territory were stretches of land held by Vlatko in Hum. He moved his residence to his last capital Novi and gave up his agreement with the Ottomans, after a few years; around the same time his younger brother Stjepan assumed the highest office in the Ottoman navy as Ahmed Pasha Hercegović (around 1473) in Istanbul. After his marriage in 1474, he reconciled with his older brother Vladislav.

Just before death of Sultan Mehmed II, Vlatko tried one more push to the heart of Bosnia but was abandoned by his allies. He completely withdrew to his fortress in Novi. The death of Mehmed II prompted the new Sultan Bayezid II to overrun Novi, its harbor and the remaining Bosnian territory. In November 1481, Ajaz-Bey of the Sanjak of Herzegovina besieged Novi but just before 14 December 1481, Vlatko ceased resisting and agreed with the Ottomans to move with his family to Istanbul. Now the entirety of Herzegovina was reorganized into the already established Sanjak of Herzegovina with the seat in Foča, and later, in 1580, would become one of the sanjaks of the Bosnia Eyalet. This signified the disappearance of the last-remaining independent point of the Bosnian state.

Titles, Ottomans and public relations

In the first half of 1448, Stjepan Vukčić, already Duke of Hum and Grand Duke of Bosnia, in an attempt to "bolster his case with the Ottomans", assumed the title herzog and styled himself Herzog of Hum and the Coast, Grand Duke of Bosnia, Knyaz of Drina, and the rest, which was first documented in early 1449. In late 1449 and early 1450, he changed it to Herzog of Saint Sava, Lord of Hum, Grand Duke of Bosnia, Knyaz of Drina, and the rest. This new style for the herzog part of the title came from the name of Saint Sava, the Serbian saint whose relics were held in Mileševa at the east of his province, but was unconnected to Stjepans' religious persuasion; he was a lifelong member of the Bosnian Church.

Not much is known about the circumstances surrounding the title. Kings Thomas Kotromanić, Frederick III and Alfonso V, as well as the Pope, Venice, and the Ottomans, bestowed Stjepan with the title. It is also probable he took the title himself in early October 1448, and  he received confirmation and recognition from the Ottomans. On 17 October 1448, the people of Dubrovnik congratulated him on "de nova dignitate cherzech acquisita". At the Hungarian court, Stjepan's new title was commented on in a less-flattering terms; "if one can be called herzog when the Turks bestowed him with a title", and later, whenever Dubrovnik was in a quarrel with Stjepan, their officials used this conjecture.

For Stjepan, the title Herzog of Split, which Hrvoje Vukčić received from Ladislav of Naples, must have left a strong impression and constantly have been in his mind. The strong impact led Stjepan to admire Hrvoje and ask King Alfonso V to be given him the same title, Herzog of Split, which Hrvoje Vukčić once bore. The internal Bosnian dynamic was met with little or no interest, although in medieval Europe, a strict hierarchical order did not allow such "usurpation" to pass unnoticed. In Bosnia, this event could have passed unnoticed but a relaxed attitude was usual in the Bosnian political context.

According to Medievalists the move had a considerable public relations value. John V. A. Fine attributed it to that fact Saint Sava's relics were considered miracle-working objects with healing properties by people of all faiths in the region, but probably more importantly, the move signaled alignment with Despot Đurađ—at times Stjepan's only ally during the civil war— and the Ottomans, whose vassal the despot had been. According to Marko Vego, with the title Duke of St. Sava (Ducatus s. Sabbe), Stjepan raised his and his family's reputation both "inside the Bosnian state and abroad", as did Vladimir Ćorović, who also concluded Stjepan thought he would raise his rank and prestige in this way.

Medievalist Sima Ćirković noted earlier historians harshly criticized Stjepan's subservient relations with the Ottomans, and noted such relations were characteristic for all Bosnian and other Balkans lords; it was practically a norm of the time. Ćirković also writes Stjepan spent his few last years as a staunch adversary of the Ottomans. He concluded Stjepan probably wished to emphasize his importance with the Ottoman court but that taking the new title had hardly more than symbolic significance; Stjepan remained for the rest of his life the Grand Duke of Bosnia. According to historians, Stjepan's acquisition of the title herzog gave the name to a province, becoming one of his enduring legacies.

Religion

Like most Bosnian nobleman of the era, Stjepan Vukčić considered himself a staunch Krstjanin, as adherents of the Bosnian Church were known and its members called themselves. His attitude toward the Bosnian Church was highlighted when King Tvrtko II died in September 1443. The events that ensued from Stjepan's refusal to recognize the deceased king's cousin and chosen heir Thomas as the new King of Bosnia created a political crisis that culminated in civil war. Thomas had converted to Roman Catholicism, a move that was catastrophic for the Krstjani and the Bosnian Church. Thomas' decision to convert was political maneuvering, albeit founded on sound reasoning, and was intended to save the realm. Thomas committed himself to demonstrate his devotion by engaging in religious prosecution against his recent fellow coreligionists. These developments prompted Stjepan to give the Krstjanins of the Bosnian Church safe haven and join the Ottomans in support of Bosnian anti-King Radivoj, Thomas' exiled brother, who remained a Bosnian Church adherent despite Thomas' crusade against the church's adherents.

The Kosača family belonged to the Bosnian Church but were "shaky Christians" like most of their countrymen. Traditionally, most Bosnians' attitudes towards religion—including those of Stjepan Vukčić—were uncommonly flexible for Europe of the era. As a Krstjanin, Stjepan titled himself after the shrine of an Orthodox saint while maintaining close relations with the papacy. His eldest childCatherine, who had also been a Krstjanka, converted to Roman Catholicism, while his youngest child Stjepan adopted Islam and changed his name to Ahmed after moving to Constantinople in about 1473. In 1454, Duke Stjepan erected an Orthodox church in Goražde, but he also requested Catholic missionaries to be sent from southern Italy to proselytize in Bosnia and expressed a desire to become Catholic himself, while developing close relations and allying himself with the Ottoman Muslims. The Holy See in the Vatican treated Stjepan as a Catholic while simultaneously the Ecumenical Patriarchate of Constantinople considered him Orthodox.

Stjepan was a lifelong protector of the Bosnian Church Krstjani and kept a high-ranking prelate of the Church, a diplomat and ambassador, a well-known and highly influential gost Radin, as his closest adviser at his court. At the end of his life, Stjepan used both Gost Radin and priest David, an Orthodox Metropolitan of Mileševa, as his court chaplains.

Land possession 

Around 1450, the possessions of the Kosača family included zemljas and župas: Humska zemlja, Zagorje, Drina, Rudine, Banjani, Trebinje, Upper and Lower Zeta, Polimlje, Dračevica, Krajina and Poljica on the Cetina. In the early 1460s, just before the fall of the Bosnian Kingdom, Stjepan controlled most of modern-day Herzegovina, at the time Humska zemlja (Hum) including Vitina, as far west as Krajina, but he had already lost control of many of his lands and towns north of Hum to the Ottomans, namely Zagorje, Drina, Taslidža, Čajniče, Višegrad, Soko fort, including Nevesinje and Gacko within Hum.

Personal life

Stjepan Vukčić was married three times. In 1424, he married Jelena, daughter of Balša III of Zeta (and granddaughter of his aunt, Jelena Balšić). Jelena died in 1453. Two years later, he married Barbara, most likely del Balzo. She died in 1459. In 1460, Stjepan was married to a German woman named Cecilie.

Issue
With his first wife Jelena, he had at least four children:
Katarina (1424–1478), in 1446 she married King King Tomaš of Bosnia, and leaving Bosnian Church converted to Catholicism;
Vladislav Hercegović ( 1427–1489), Grand Duke of Bosnia, Lord of Krajina, married Kyra Ana, daughter of Georgios Kantakuzenos in 1455;
Vlatko Hercegović ( 1428–1489), Herzog of St. Sava, married an Apulian noblewoman;
Hersekzade Ahmed Pasha ( 1430–1515), baptized Stjepan; the youngest son of Stjepan Vukčić, whom Sultan Mehmed II took to his court, became a Muslim in the Sultan's service. He became the Grand Vizier and Grand Admiral to the Sultan, married Sultan Bayezid II's daughter, Fatima, in 1482; and had descendants by her.

With his second wife Barbara, he had at least two children:
 son (1456), a short-lived child whose name is not known;
 Mara, daughter.

Historiography, personality and legacy

In historiography

Before publication of the historical biography by Sima Ćirković, Herceg Stefan Vukčić-Kosača i njegovo doba, and despite the large number of archival sources, historiography lacked a critical monograph on Stjepan's life using modern scientific methodology. The Dubrovnik Archive, and archives in other Italian cities' archives, and one in Buda, Hungary, are sources of information on the political and diplomatic history of the time. Especially valuable are Mavro Orbini's and Jakov Lukarević's first historical works on Stjepan's life and career. These texts were written when the systematic use of archival sources was not yet used. 

At the end of the 19th century, Ilarion Ruvarac intended to work on the history of the Kosača family but the first research was done a few years later by Ljubomir Jovanović, first with War of Duke Stjepan with Dubrovnik and then with the first-and-incomplete work Stjepan Vukčić Kosača. According Ćirković, the basic outlines for researching Stjepan's life can be found in Konstantin Jireček's History of Serbs, in which he briefly covers Stjepan's life, while Vladimir Ćorović's History of Bosnia has a more-extensive overview but is insufficiently comprehensive.  In 1964, Ćirković published his historical biography Herceg Stefan Vukčić-Kosača i njegovo doba, using his predecessors, and in particular the research of Ilarion Ruvarac, Jakov Lukarević, Lajos Thallóczy, Aleksa Ivić, Mihajlo Dinić, and Vladimir Ćorović.

Personality

According to  Sima Ćirković, assessing information about Stjepan Vukčić Kosača's personality from contemporary documents is unhelpful because they were created under specific circumstances to satisfy political and economic needs, so they are often idiosyncratic and biased. The representation of Stjepan's personality and image based on contemporaneous statements from merchants and ambassadors from Dubrovnik are biased. Accounts arising from contact with Stjepan and depending on the circumstances contained courteous praise of his wisdom, political prudence, law-abiding righteousness, and generosity, and fierce condemnation and insult when circumstances demanded it.

The scarcity of sources did not discourage historians whose assessment of Stjepan's character is unflattering  Early-modern Dubrovnik historian Jakov Lukarević described Stjepan with conspicuous indignation: "He barely knew the letters" and "he was all given over to rage, wine, and living with slave-girls and harlots". Stjepan's "characterization" particularly concerned Medievalist Lajos Thallóczy, who made several harsh assessments; according to him, Stjepan "could have been a model for a Balkan Machiavelli"; "is a typical Balkan knyaz who can serve as a model"; "we find no ethical features in him, nothing sympathetic, only a marauder"; and "neither his word nor his written promise could be trusted".

Thallóczy's characterization was taken over by Konstantin Jireček, who added Stjepan was a "loyal vassal of Porte". He paraphrased Thallóczy, calling Stjepan "cunning, capricious, brutal and a coward, a friend of wine and women, unusually reckless in choosing means, but with a highly developed ability to notice a change in the political circumstance". According to Vladimir Ćorović, Stjepan had "a strong will and a bad temper", "had strength and skills, but no morale", and saying "since coming to power, he was surprising the world with his ruthlessness, by which he provoked conflicts not only with his neighbors but even in his own family".

Ćirković criticized these descriptions, especially Thallóczy's because of his "inherent superficiality and pretentiousness" and based almost entirely on the author's "ideological beliefs [rather] than on a sober examination of the source". He also noted "the historical role of Duke Stjepan in recent historiography is dominated by condemnation for serving the Turks", and that such judgmental assessments never take into account many circumstances. Ćirković added: "the common feature of all assessments of Herceg's character is that it was seldom taken into account the extent to which Stjepan's qualities were only his, and not the characteristics of the entire society of that time".

Ćirković concludes, "inversion, treachery, inconsistency cannot be used to characterize any one person from the Bosnian history of the 15th century, because these are characteristics of all feudal lords of that time".

Legacy

The medieval town Novi was founded as a fortress in a small fishing village in 1382 by the first King of Bosnia Tvrtko I Kotromanić, and was originally named Sveti Stefan (Saint Stephen). After the death of Tvrtko, Duke Sandalj Hranić acquired Sveti Stefan. During his reign, the town began trading salt. When Hranić died, his nephew Stjepan Vukčić Kosača, inherited it. During his reign, the town grew in importance and became Stjepan's winter seat and was renamed Herceg Novi.

The name "Herzegovina" is the most-important and indelible legacy of Stjepan Vukčić Kosača; it is unique within the Serbo-Croatian-speaking Balkans, because one person gave his noble title, which in the last few years of his life became inseparable from his name, to a region that was previously called Humska zemlja or Hum. Herzegovina still exists with the name Bosnia and Herzegovina.

This is a superficial understanding because the appearance of the name Herzegovina, which is recorded in 1 February 1454 in a letter written by the Ottoman commander Esebeg from Skopje, cannot be attributed to Stjepan alone, and his title was not of decisive importance. More important is the Ottoman custom of calling  newly acquired lands by the names of their earlier rulers. It was enough for the Ottomans to conquer Stjepan's land to start calling it Herzegovina. Also, Stjepan did not establish this province as a feudal and political unit of the Bosnian state; that honor befell Grand Duke of Bosnia Vlatko Vuković, who received it from King Tvrtko I; Sandalj Hranić expanded it and reaffirmed the Kosača family's supremacy.

References

Bibliography 

. Via Scribd

Further redings

 

s
s
Grand Dukes of Bosnia
s
Medieval Bosnian nobility
Nobility of Herzegovina
1404 births
1466 deaths
Herceg Novi
Blagaj